Kakripara is a village in South Salmara-Mankachar District in the Indian state of Assam. It is situated at the extreme south-westernmost end of North-East India near to the Bangladesh–India border.

References

Villages in South Salmara-Mankachar district